PT Bentoel Internasional Investama Tbk, commonly known as Bentoel Group, is an Indonesian tobacco company. It is the second-largest in the year of establishment and fourth-largest tobacco firm in Indonesia after Sampoerna, Gudang Garam and Djarum in terms of market share. In 2009, London-based British American Tobacco, the world's second-largest tobacco company, acquired a 99.74% stake in Bentoel. In early 2010, the company was merged with PT BAT Indonesia Tbk, with Bentoel continued to operate as the survived entity; however Bentoel had revive the BAT Indonesia name ever since.

Headquartered in Jakarta with the manufacturing plant located in Malang, it has the local brands include Bentoel Biru, Bentoel SJT, Ardath, Tali Jagat and Star Mild. It also manufactures international brands such as 555, Lucky Strike and Dunhill.

History

Ong Hok Liong (born 12 August 1893) worked in his father's tobacco trading company in Bojonegoro, East Java, but his propensity for gambling prompted his wife to move the family, first to Sumberwaras and then to Malang. In 1920, Ong started a kretek company with his brothers and pawned his wife's jewelry to fund his share. He introduced numerous brands but most failed. In 1935, he developed a new brand to be called Djeruk Manis (sweet orange) but during a visit to the sacred Gunung Kawi mountain, he had a dream about a bentoel (cassava root) vendor. This prompted him to adopt the name Bentoel for his new cigarette. The brand was a success. By 1950, Ong had about 3,000 staff and acquired a cigarette factory in Blitar. A heavy smoker who drank arak rice alcohol to ease the pain in his throat, Ong died in 1967 from chronic liver disease. Labor problems in 1968 prompted Bentoel to begin using fully automated rolling machines - a first for the kretek industry. 

By the late 1970s, Bentoel was ranked third in Indonesian cigarette production and dominated the machine-made kretek sector. In 1979, a government decree restricted the amount of machine-made kretek. This policy caused the company's fortunes to suffer. Bentoel received significant foreign investment but in late 1990 its chief executive (one of Ong's sons) resigned as the company had debts of several hundred million dollars. In 1987, Rajawali Corpora bought a majority stake and replaced managers and directors. In June 2009, BAT bought an 85% stake in PT Bentoel Internasional Investama for $494 million and would purchase the remaining public shares by the end of August 2009.

1987 lawsuit
In 1987, lawyer Robert Odjahan Tambunan filed a class-action lawsuit on behalf of Indonesian youth against Bentoel for allegedly breaking the law by using the words Remaja Jaya (Successful Youth) as a brand name. Central Jakarta District Court dismissed the Rp 1 trillion lawsuit on the grounds Tambunan had no right to act as a representative of Indonesian youth. Tambunan had argued the nicotine product could destroy Indonesian children and lead to the nation's downfall. The lawsuit was also filed against Jakarta city administration, the Justice Ministry's patent and copyright directorate, and Prambors radio station.

Business
In 2016, Bentoel Internasional was the fourth largest cigarette producer in Indonesia with a market share of approximately 7%. The company makes machine-made kretek, hand-made kretek and white cigarettes.

References

External links 
 

1930 establishments in the Dutch East Indies
1990 initial public offerings
2009 mergers and acquisitions
Companies listed on the Indonesia Stock Exchange
Manufacturing companies based in Jakarta
Manufacturing companies established in 1930
Tobacco companies of Indonesia
British American Tobacco